Robert Lindstedt and Horia Tecău were the defending champions, but decided not to participate together.  Lindstedt played alongside Daniel Nestor, while Tecǎu teams up with Max Mirnyi. Each team lose in the second round.

Seeds

Draw

Finals

Top half

Bottom half

References
Main Draw

Western and Southern Open Doubles
Doubles men